Arthur Richard Scholes (August 22, 1890 – November 9, 1953) was a Canadian long-distance runner. He competed in the marathon at the 1912 Summer Olympics and placed 15th.

References

1890 births
1953 deaths
Athletes (track and field) at the 1920 Summer Olympics
Canadian male long-distance runners
Canadian male marathon runners
Olympic track and field athletes of Canada
Athletes from Toronto